The following are notable boarding schools in Australia. There are 189 boarding schools in Australia.

Australian Capital Territory
Canberra Girls' Grammar School, Deakin
Canberra Grammar School, Red Hill
Queyanbean Public High School, Queanbean

New South Wales

Former boarding schools
Trinity Grammar School, Summer Hill (until 2019)

Northern Territory
Haileybury Rendall School
Kormilda College
St Philip's College, Alice Springs

Queensland

South Australia

Tasmania

Victoria

Western Australia

See also

List of schools in Australia
List of boarding schools
List of international schools

References

 
Boarding
Australia